Mario Mihai (born 16 February 1999) is a Romanian footballer who plays as a midfielder.

Career statistics

Club

Statistics accurate as of match played 27 September 2018

References

External links
 

1999 births
Living people
Romanian footballers
Association football midfielders
Liga I players
Liga II players
Liga III players
FC Steaua București players
FC Steaua II București players
LPS HD Clinceni players
AFC Turris-Oltul Turnu Măgurele players
ASC Daco-Getica București players